Gaël Da Silva (Vaulx-en-Velin, 30 December 1984) is a French gymnast. He competed for the national team at the 2012 Summer Olympics in the men's artistic team all-around, and finished 10th in the men's floor.

References

French male artistic gymnasts
Living people
Olympic gymnasts of France
Gymnasts at the 2012 Summer Olympics
People from Vaulx-en-Velin
1984 births
Sportspeople from Lyon Metropolis
21st-century French people